Jaroslav Rudiš (born 8 June 1972 in Turnov) is a Czech writer, journalist and musician.

Rudiš became known after publishing his first novel Nebe pod Berlínem ("The Sky under Berlin") in 2002, the tale of a Czech teacher who chooses to leave his job and to start a new life in Berlin, where he plays music in the underground, which – along with the ghosts of suicide jumpers – gains almost mystical importance to him, and joins an indie rock group (which is a semi-autobiographical motive).  It was one of the most successful Czech books of recent years. For this novel he received Jiří Orten Award.

His collaboration with draughtsman Jaromír 99 led to the publication of three closely connected graphic novels taking place among railway employees, Bílý potok ("White Brook", 2003), Hlavní nádraží ("Central Station", 2004) and Zlaté hory ("Golden Hills"). The trilogy has been adapted into an animated feature film, Alois Nebel, which was released in 2011.

See also 
 List of Czech writers

References

External links 

Profil autora: Jaroslav Rudiš (literární.cz)
Jaroslav Rudiš (iliteratura.cz)

1972 births
Living people
Czech male writers
Recipients of the Cross of the Order of Merit of the Federal Republic of Germany